The Roman Catholic Church of Ss. Peter and Paul is centrally located in the centre of Potsdam, and ends the Brandenburger Strasse to the east, at the western end of which is the Potsdamer Brandenburger Gate. The present church building was completed in 1870 and served equally the Potsdam parishioners (now part of the Archdiocese of Berlin) and the Catholic soldiers who were stationed in the city. Since 1992 it has had the status of a provost church.

See also 
 Day of Potsdam

References 

 

Churches completed in 1870
Churches in Potsdam
Roman Catholic churches in Brandenburg